The Old Custom House is the oldest surviving government building in California, built in 1827 by Mexican authorities in Monterey, then the capital of Alta California. The former custom house is the first designated California Historical Landmark, marking the site where U.S. Commodore John Drake Sloat raised the American flag and declared California part of the United States in 1846 during the American Conquest of California.

History

In 1821 New Spain—Mexico won independence from Spain, in the Mexican War of Independence, and for nearly 25 years Monterey was in the Mexican Territory of Alta California. Under Mexican rule the trade restrictions were lifted and coastal ports were opened to foreign trade. This drew in trade from British, American, and South American traders.

To collect customs duties (tax monies) at the Monterey Bay port, the Mexican government built the Custom House, making it the oldest government building in present-day California. 

On July 7, 1846, during the Mexican–American War, U.S. Commodore John Drake Sloat raised the American flag, declaring California part of the United States during the American Conquest of California.

Historic preservation

The Monterey Custom House was a landmark that the Native Sons of the Golden West determined should not disappear if within their power to prevent it. The property belonged to the United States Government, but the Native Sons obtained a lease of the buildings and grounds and restored them in the early 1900s.  The lease was ultimately transferred to a State Commission appointed under a legislative act passed in 1901, which act also carried an appropriation for further restoration of the building.

The Custom House became the first California Historical Landmark on June 1, 1932, and was designated a National Historic Landmark in 1960. It is part of the larger Monterey State Historic Park, itself a National Historic Landmark District along with the nearby Larkin House.

See also
National Register of Historic Places listings in Monterey County, California
California hide trade
List of the oldest buildings in California

References

External links
Official Monterey State Historic Park website

 

History of Monterey County, California
California Historical Landmarks
Adobe buildings and structures in California
Buildings and structures in Monterey, California
Museums in Monterey County, California
National Historic Landmarks in California
Government buildings on the National Register of Historic Places in California
Government buildings completed in 1827
Mexican California
Custom houses in the United States
Spanish Revival architecture in California
Tourist attractions in Monterey, California
Monterey State Historic Park
National Register of Historic Places in Monterey County, California
Custom houses on the National Register of Historic Places
1827 establishments in Alta California